() is a firm cheese from the Italian island of Sardinia which is made from sheep milk: specifically from the milk of the local Sardinian breed. It was awarded  status in 1991 and granted Protected designation of origin (PDO in English and DOP in Italian) protection in 1996, the year in which this European Union certification scheme was introduced. 

 is an uncooked hard cheese made from fresh whole sheep's milk curdled using lamb or kid rennet. The mixture is poured into moulds that will give the cheese its characteristic shape. After a brief period in brine, the moulds are lightly smoked and left to ripen in cool cellars in central Sardinia. The average weight of the finished product is : sometimes a bit more, sometimes a bit less depending on the conditions of manufacture. The rind varies from deep yellow to dark brown in colour and encases a paste that varies from white to straw-yellow. The sharpness of the flavour depends on the length of maturation. The young  is about a couple of months old; the mature type is more than six months old and needs strictly controlled temperature and humidity.

In the United States it is most often found as a hard cheese, its more mature form.

See also

 , an Argentine cheese

References

Sardinian cheeses
Sheep's-milk cheeses
Italian products with protected designation of origin
Cheeses with designation of origin protected in the European Union
Cuisine of Sardinia